"How to Fall in Love (Part 1)" is a song by the Bee Gees. It was the third and final single issued from the album Size Isn't Everything. After the big hit of "For Whom the Bell Tolls", the Gibb brothers experienced a new European hit with this R&B ballad. The song was the result of one song written by Barry and another song written by Robin, mixed together. The single peaked at number thirty in the UK and dominated the top forty of some European countries.

In other countries in Europe, "Kiss of Life" was released in place of "How to Fall in Love, Part 1". Polydor affiliates thought the lively "Kiss of Life" more likely to get the charts.

Track listing
7" single (UK)
A: "How to Fall in Love, Part 1" [edit] - 4:10
B: "Fallen Angel" [Remix] - 7:09

CD single (GER)
 "How to Fall in Love, Part 1" [edit] - 4:10
 "855-7019" - 6:22
 "Fallen Angel" [Remix] - 7:09
 On the CD, "855-7019" features the sound of a needle being dropped at the very start and being lifted at the very end, respectively followed and preceded by surface noise, making it sound like a vinyl transfer. (In Germany, the song was originally featured on the B-side of the 7" single in its German release.) It is unclear whether the inclusion of such noises on the CD version is intentional.
CD single
 "How to Fall in Love, Part 1" [Edit] - 4:10
 "I've Gotta Get a Message to You" [album version] - 2:50
 "Tragedy" - 5:13
 "New York Mining Disaster 1941" - 2:10

Bee Gees songs
1994 singles
Songs written by Barry Gibb
Songs written by Maurice Gibb
Songs written by Robin Gibb
1993 songs
Polydor Records singles